Joshua P. Kennedy (born 20 June 1988) is a former Australian rules footballer who played for the Sydney Swans in the Australian Football League (AFL). He previously played for the Hawthorn Football Club.

The son and grandson of former Hawthorn players, Kennedy was originally recruited to Hawthorn in the 2006 national draft under the father–son rule. He debuted for the club during the 2008 season, but was traded to Sydney prior to the 2010 season, having played 13 games for Hawthorn. An inside midfielder, Kennedy became a star player for Sydney. He has won the Bob Skilton Medal three times as the club's best and fairest (2012, 2015, 2016) and also played in a premiership in 2012. Kennedy has been named in the All-Australian team on three occasions (2012, 2014, 2016) in addition to finishing third in the 2014 and 2017 Brownlow Medal counts. He was the captain of Sydney since the 2017 season, until Kennedy stepped down from the role in February 2022.

Early years
Kennedy is the son of John Kennedy Jr., a former Hawthorn player, and the grandson of John Kennedy Sr., an Australian Football Hall of Fame member. He graduated from Xavier College in Kew, Victoria in 2006, having also played for the Ashburton Junior Football Club as a youngster.

AFL career

Hawthorn (2008–2009)
In mid-2006 it was announced that he would be recruited in the 2006 AFL Draft by the Hawthorn Football Club for the 2007 season, under the father-son rule. Kennedy made his debut for the club in round nine of the 2008 season. He played 2 further games in his debut season, and 10 the following season, but was traded to Sydney at the end of the 2009 season, along with Ben McGlynn, with Hawthorn receiving draft picks 39, 46, and 70 in exchange.

Sydney (2010–present)
In late 2009, Kennedy was offered a three-year deal by the Sydney Swans. Kennedy accepted the offer, as the Swans' offered him more opportunities to play senior football than Hawthorn, who had many players similar to Kennedy. He was traded to the Swans along with teammate Ben McGlynn for 2009 AFL Draft picks 39, 46 and 70. Kennedy capped a fantastic year by finishing 3rd in the Sydney Swans Best & Fairest, behind winner Kieren Jack and runner-up Shane Mumford. Kennedy was also awarded the Paul Roos Award for best player in the finals series.

Kennedy followed up his outstanding debut year in Sydney with another very consistent season in 2011. Despite a relatively slow start, Kennedy hit top form in the 2nd half of the year to finish equal 2nd with Rhyce Shaw in the Bob Skilton Medal (behind winner Adam Goodes). Kennedy further enhanced his growing reputation around the league with 2 more outstanding performances in the Swans' finals games against St.Kilda and Hawthorn.

Kennedy had his most consistent year in 2012 earning himself his first All-Australian team selection. Kennedy won the Brett Kirk Medal in round one. Kennedy polled in equal eighth place in the Brownlow Medal, with 19 votes - the most of any Sydney player.  He played in Sydney's Grand Final winning team, where he had 26 disposals and kicked two goals. He also won the Sydney Best & Fairest (Bob Skilton Medal) with (877) votes to win by a massive 172 votes from 2nd Ted Richards (705) and 3rd Ryan O'Keefe (701), managing to consistently poll votes in each round.

Kennedy's 2015 season was rewarded with his second Bob Skilton Medal. He won the best and fairest for the second consecutive year in 2016.

In 2016, Kennedy won his 3rd All-Australian selection, 3rd Bob Skilton Medal and was awarded the inaugural Gary Ayres Award for best player in the 2016 finals series.

On 9 December 2016, Kennedy was named the new captain of the club, taking over from previous co-captains Kieren Jack and Jarrad McVeigh. He finished third in the 2017 Brownlow Medal, polling more votes than any other Sydney player.

On 25 June 2020, Kennedy played his 250th AFL game against the Western Bulldogs at the Sydney Cricket Ground; his grandfather John Kennedy Sr. died on the morning of the game, aged 91.

Statistics
Updated to the end of round 23, 2022.

|-
| 2007 ||  || 36
| 0 || — || — || — || — || — || — || — || — || — || — || — || — || — || — || 0
|-
| 2008 ||  || 36
| 3 || 0 || 0 || 17 || 24 || 41 || 12 || 13 || 0.0 || 0.0 || 5.7 || 8.0 || 13.7 || 4.0 || 4.3 || 0
|-
| 2009 ||  || 32
| 10 || 4 || 5 || 65 || 129 || 194 || 31 || 42 || 0.4 || 0.5 || 6.5 || 12.9 || 19.4 || 3.1 || 4.2 || 0
|-
| 2010 ||  || 12
| 24 || 10 || 10 || 210 || 272 || 482 || 70 || 107 || 0.4 || 0.4 || 8.8 || 11.3 || 20.1 || 2.9 || 4.5 || 0
|-
| 2011 ||  || 12
| 24 || 10 || 19 || 272 || 256 || 528 || 54 || 135 || 0.4 || 0.8 || 11.3 || 10.7 || 22.0 || 2.3 || 5.6 || 3
|-
| bgcolor=F0E68C | 2012# ||  || 12
| 25 || 29 || 13 || 307 || bgcolor=CAE1FF| 401† || 708 || 73 || 125 || 1.2 || 0.5 || 12.3 || 16.0 || 28.3 || 2.9 || 5.0 || 19
|-
| 2013 ||  || 12
| 25 || 14 || 16 || 257 || bgcolor=CAE1FF | 421† || 678 || 42 || 123 || 0.6 || 0.6 || 10.3 || bgcolor=CAE1FF | 16.8† || 27.1 || 1.7 || 4.9 || 14
|-
| 2014 ||  || 12
| 23 || 13 || 20 || 272 || bgcolor=CAE1FF | 385† || 657 || 75 || 132 || 0.6 || 0.9 || 11.8 || bgcolor=CAE1FF | 16.7† || 28.6 || 3.3 || 5.7 || 21
|-
| 2015 ||  || 12
| 24 || 15 || 23 || 308 || 423 || 731 || 74 || 149 || 0.6 || 1.0 || 12.8 || 17.6 || 30.5 || 3.1 || 6.2 || 25
|-
| 2016 ||  || 12
| 25 || 20 || 9 || 315 || bgcolor=CAE1FF | 472† || 787 || 67 || 139 || 0.8 || 0.4 || 12.6 || 18.9 || 31.5 || 2.7 || 5.6 || 14
|-
| 2017 ||  || 12
| 21 || 16 || 6 || 248 || 344 || 592 || 52 || 103 || 0.8 || 0.3 || 11.8 || 16.4 || 28.2 || 2.5 || 4.9 || 23
|-
| 2018 ||  || 12
| 23 || 10 || 12 || 250 || 334 || 584 || 55 || 113 || 0.4 || 0.5 || 10.9 || 14.5 || 25.4 || 2.4 || 4.9 || 6
|-
| 2019 ||  || 12
| 19 || 7 || 9 || 233 || 271 || 504 || 52 || 126 || 0.4 || 0.5 || 12.3 || 14.3 || 26.5 || 2.7 || 6.6 || 9
|-
| 2020 ||  || 12
| 12 || 3 || 3 || 129 || 119 || 248 || 34 || 62 || 0.3 || 0.3 || 10.8 || 9.9 || 20.7 || 2.8 || 5.2 || 4
|-
| 2021 ||  || 12
| 21 || 4 || 6 || 220 || 285 || 505 || 76 || 100 || 0.2 || 0.3 || 10.5 || 13.6 || 24.0 || 3.6 || 4.8 || 8
|-
| 2022 ||  || 12
| 11 || 2 || 0 || 66 || 67 || 133 || 30 || 19 || 0.2 || 0.0 || 6.0 || 6.1 || 12.1 || 2.7 || 1.7 || 
|- class="sortbottom"
! colspan=3| Career
! 290 !! 157 !! 151 !! 3169 !! 4203 !! 7372 !! 797 !! 1488 !! 0.5 !! 0.5 !! 10.9 !! 14.5 !! 25.4 !! 2.7 !! 5.1 !! 146
|}

Notes

Honours and achievements
Sydney
 AFL premiership player: 2012
 2× Minor premiership: 2014, 2016

Individual
 3× All-Australian team: 2012, 2014, 2016
 3× Bob Skilton Medal: 2012, 2015, 2016
 Sydney captain: 2017–2021
 Brett Kirk Medal: 2012 (round 1)
 Peter Badcoe VC Medal: 2012 (round 3)
 Gary Ayres Award: 2016
 Box Hill Hawks All-Stars team (1999–2019)

Personal life 
Kennedy's paternal grandmother has Italian heritage and referred to his late grandfather John Kennedy Sr. as Nonno.
 His mother Bernadette also has an Italian background. Through his mother, Kennedy is the grandson of former St Kilda footballer Felix Russo and nephew of former Hawthorn and St Kilda footballer Peter Russo. Kennedy is the first cousin of former St Kilda and Collingwood footballer Luke Ball.

In January 2012, Kennedy started dating Colombian native Ana Calle, who is four years his senior. In 2015, Calle gave birth to their first child, a boy. In November 2015, the couple married in Calle's hometown of Medellín. In 2019, Calle gave birth to their second child, a girl.

He has completed commerce studies at Sydney University.

References

External links

1988 births
Living people
Hawthorn Football Club players
Sydney Swans players
Box Hill Football Club players
Sydney Swans Premiership players
People educated at Xavier College
Australian rules footballers from Melbourne
Sandringham Dragons players
All-Australians (AFL)
Bob Skilton Medal winners
Australian people of Irish descent
Australian people of Italian descent
Sportspeople of Italian descent
One-time VFL/AFL Premiership players